The IBM 5151 is a 12" transistor–transistor logic (TTL) monochrome monitor, shipped with the original IBM Personal Computer for use with the IBM Monochrome Display Adapter. A few other cards were designed to work with it, such as the Hercules Graphics Card.

The monitor has an 11.5-inch wide CRT (measured diagonally) with 90 degree deflection, etched to reduce glare, with a resolution of 350 horizontal lines and a 50 Hz refresh rate. It uses TTL digital inputs through a 9-pin D-shell connector, being able to display at least three brightness levels, according to the different pin 6 and 7 signals. It is also plugged into the female AC port on the IBM PC power supply, and thus did not have a power switch of its own.

The IBM 5151 uses the P39 phosphor type, producing a bright green monochrome image intended for displaying high-resolution text. This phosphor has high persistence, which decreases display flicker but causes smearing when the image changes.

Specifications

References

External links
 Picture of IBM 5151 display in operation (PC Shell shown on screen)

5151